Hrastje may refer to: 

In Croatia:
Hrastje, Croatia, a village in the Municipality of Sveti Ivan Zelina

In Slovenia:
Hrastje, Kranj, a settlement in the Municipality of Kranj
Hrastje, Maribor, a settlement in the Municipality of Maribor
Hrastje, Šentjernej, a settlement in the Municipality of Šentjernej
Hrastje, Šentjur, a settlement in the Municipality of Šentjur
Hrastje–Mota, a settlement in the Municipality of Radenci
Hrastje ob Bistrici, a former settlement in the Municipality of Bistrica ob Sotli
Hrastje pri Cerkljah, a settlement in the Municipality of Brežice
Hrastje pri Grosupljem, a settlement in the Municipality of Grosuplje
Hrastje pri Mirni Peči, a settlement in the Municipality of Mirna Peč